Shek Mun is an industrial and financial area in Sha Tin City, New Territories of Hong Kong.

Shek Mun lies just east of the Shing Mun River, and northeast of the City One apartment and shopping complex.

Housing
Shek Mun Estate is a public housing estate in Shek Mun, completed in 2009.

Private housing estates in Shek Mun include: Ravana Garden, Garden Vista and Pictorial Garden.

Other features
Several educational facilities are located in Shek Mun including International Christian School and the Hong Kong Baptist University Affiliated School Wong Kam Fai Secondary and Primary School. A branch of the Hong Kong Baptist University, as well as local public elementary and secondary schools which are run by the university. Shek Mun is also home to some light industry and manufacturing.

Shek Mun will be the location of the Jockey Club Kitchee Centre, which is dedicated to youth football development and was scheduled to open in 2014.

Transport
Shek Mun is served by the Shek Mun station on the Tuen Ma line of the MTR rapid transit railway system.

Education
Shek Mun is in Primary One Admission (POA) School Net 91. Within the school net are multiple aided schools (operated independently but funded with government money); no government schools are in this net.

References

Sha Tin District